Battle of Jalalabad may refer to:
Battle of Jalalabad (1710), a conflict in the Mughal-Sikh Wars
Battle of Jalalabad, a conflict in the First Anglo-Afghan War
Battle of Jalalabad (1989), a conflict in the 1989–1992 Afghan Civil War